Vlatko Kostov  (born 1 September 1965) is a Macedonian football manager and former player who played as a midfielder. 

He used to manage FK Renova, who became champions in Macedonia for the 2009–10 season. After the year, Renova and Kostov could not reach a deal and they parted. Kostov became top assistant to the Macedonian national team manager Mirsad Jonuz.

In 2012, he led Renova to the Macedonian Cup final, which they won 3–1 in his home town of Štip.

Honours and awards

As a player:

Vardar Skopje
Macedonian First League: 1
Winner: 1992–93

As a coach:

Renova
Macedonian First League: 1
Winner: 2009–10
Macedonian Cup: 1
Winners: 2011–12
Osogovo
Macedonian Second League: 1
Winner: 1997–98
Kumanovo
Macedonian Second League: 1
Winner: 1999–2000
Bregalnica Shtip
Macedonian Second League: 1
Winner: 2003–04
Turnovo
Macedonian Second League: 1
Winner: 2007–08

References

1965 births
Living people
Sportspeople from Štip
Association football midfielders
Yugoslav footballers
Macedonian footballers
FK Bregalnica Štip players
FC Lokomotiv 1929 Sofia players
FK Pelister players
FK Vardar players
Yugoslav Second League players
Yugoslav First League players
First Professional Football League (Bulgaria) players
Macedonian First Football League players
Yugoslav expatriate footballers
Macedonian expatriate footballers
Expatriate footballers in Bulgaria
Macedonian expatriate sportspeople in Bulgaria
Macedonian football managers
FK Osogovo managers
FK Kumanovo managers
FK Bregalnica Štip managers
KF Renova managers
FK Horizont Turnovo managers
North Macedonia national football team managers
FK Rabotnički managers
Al-Raed FC managers
Macedonian expatriate football managers
Expatriate football managers in Saudi Arabia
Macedonian expatriate sportspeople in Saudi Arabia